Gymnarthridae is an extinct family of tuditanomorph microsaurs. Gymnarthrids are known from Europe and North America and existed from the Late Carboniferous through the Early Permian. Remains have been found from the Czech Republic, Nova Scotia, Illinois, Texas, and Oklahoma.

Gymnarthrids are relatively elongate with short limbs. The skulls of gymnarthrids are also small, with a single row of large conical teeth on the margin of the jaw (a feature that distinguishes them from other microsaurs). In some genera, such as Bolterpeton and Cardiocephalus, the teeth are labiolingually compressed.

Gymnarthridae was first erected by E. C. Case in 1910 to include the newly described Gymnarthrus. It was placed in a new suborder, Gymnarthria. Case initially considered gymnarthrids to be reptiles, but later recognized them to be amphibians, placing Cardiocephalus in the family. Pariotichus was placed within Gymnarthridae by Alfred Romer after having previously been assigned to the basal eureptilian family Captorhinidae by Edward Drinker Cope.

References

Prehistoric amphibians of Europe
Prehistoric amphibians of North America
Carboniferous amphibians
Permian amphibians
 
Prehistoric amphibian families